In multilinear algebra, the higher-order singular value decomposition (HOSVD) of a tensor is a specific orthogonal Tucker decomposition. It may be regarded as one generalization of the matrix singular value decomposition. It has applications in computer vision, computer graphics, machine learning, scientific computing, and signal processing. Some aspects can be traced as far back as F. L. Hitchcock in 1928, but it was L. R. Tucker who developed for third-order tensors the general Tucker decomposition in the 1960s, further advocated by L. De Lathauwer et al. in their Multilinear SVD work that employs the power method, and advocated by Vasilescu and Terzopoulos that developed M-mode SVD.

The term HOSVD was coined by Lieven DeLathauwer, but the algorithm referred to commonly in the literature as the HOSVD and attributed to either Tucker or DeLathauwer was developed by Vasilescu and Terzopoulos.  Robust and L1-norm-based variants of HOSVD have also been proposed.

Definition 

Observe that the mode/factor matrix  does not depend on the particular on the specific definition of the mode m flattening. By the properties of the multilinear multiplication, we havewhere  denotes the conjugate transpose. The second equality is because the 's are unitary matrices.

Compact HOSVD 
As in the case of the compact singular value decomposition of a matrix, it is also possible to consider a compact HOSVD, which is very useful in applications.

As flattenings are bijective maps and the above formula is valid for all , we find as before thatwhere the core tensor  is now of size .

Multilinear rank 
The multilinear rank is a tuple in  where .

The compact HOSVD is a rank-revealing deomposition in the sense that the dimensions of its core tensor correspond with the components of the multilinear rank of the tensor.

Interpretation 
The following geometric interpretation is valid for both the full and compact HOSVD. Let  be the multilinear rank of the tensor . It is easy to verify that  is an orthonormal set of tensors. This means that the HOSVD can be interpreted as a way to express the tensor  with respect to a specifically chosen orthonormal basis  with the coefficients given as the multidimensional array .

Computation 
Let  be a tensor with a rank-, where  contains the reals  as a subset.

Classic computation 
The strategy for computing the Multilinear SVD and the M-mode SVD was introduced in the 1960s by L. R. Tucker, further advocated by L. De Lathauwer et al., and by Vasilescu and Terzopulous.  The term HOSVD was coined by Lieven De Lathauwer, but the algorithm typically referred to in the literature as HOSVD was introduced by Vasilescu and Terzopoulos with the name M-mode SVD.  It is a parallel computation that employs the matrix SVD to compute the orthonormal mode matrices.

M-mode SVD:  
 For , do the following:
 Construct the mode-m flattening ;
 Compute the (compact) singular value decomposition , and store the left singular vectors ;

 Compute the core tensor  via the multilinear multiplication

Interlacing computation 
A strategy that is significantly faster when some or all  consists of interlacing the computation of the core tensor and the factor matrices, as follows:

 Set ;
 For  perform the following:
 Construct the standard mode-m flattening ;
 Compute the (compact) singular value decomposition , and store the left singular vectors ;
 Set , or, equivalently, .

In-place computation 
The HOSVD can be computed in-place via the Fused In-place Sequentially Truncated Higher Order Singular Value Decomposition (FIST-HOSVD)  algorithm by overwriting the original tensor by the HOSVD core tensor, significantly reducing the memory consumption of computing HOSVD.

Approximation 
In applications, such as those mentioned below, a common problem consists of approximating a given tensor  by one with a reduced multilinear rank.

A simple idea for trying to solve this optimization problem is to truncate the (compact) SVD in step 2 of either the classic or the interlaced computation. A classically truncated HOSVD is obtained by replacing step 2 in the classic computation by
 Compute a rank- truncated SVD , and store the top  left singular vectors ;
while a sequentially truncated HOSVD (or successively truncated HOSVD) is obtained by replacing step 2 in the interlaced computation by
 Compute a rank- truncated SVD , and store the top  left singular vectors . Unfortunately, truncation does not result in an optimal solution for the best low multilinear rank optimization problem,. However, both the classically and interleaved truncated HOSVD result in a quasi-optimal solution: if  denotes the classically or sequentially truncated HOSVD and  denotes the optimal solution to the best low multilinear rank approximation problem, thenin practice this means that if there exists an optimal solution with a small error, then a truncated HOSVD will for many intended purposes also yield a sufficiently good solution.

Applications 
The HOSVD is most commonly applied to the extraction of relevant information from multi-way arrays.

Starting in the early 2000s, Vasilescu addressed causal questions by reframing the data analysis, recognition and synthesis problems as multilinear tensor problems.  The power of the tensor framework was showcased by decomposing and representing an image in terms of its causal factors of data formation, in the context of Human Motion Signatures for gait recognition, face recognition—TensorFaces and computer graphics—TensorTextures.

The HOSVD has been successfully applied to signal processing and big data, e.g., in genomic signal processing. These applications also inspired a higher-order GSVD (HO GSVD) and a tensor GSVD.

A combination of HOSVD and SVD also has been applied for real-time event detection from complex data streams (multivariate data with space and time dimensions) in disease surveillance.

It is also used in tensor product model transformation-based controller design. 

The concept of HOSVD was carried over to functions by Baranyi and Yam via the TP model transformation. This extension led to the definition of the HOSVD-based canonical form of tensor product functions and Linear Parameter Varying system models and to convex hull manipulation based control optimization theory, see TP model transformation in control theories.

HOSVD was proposed to be applied to multi-view data analysis and was successfully applied to in silico drug discovery from gene expression.

Robust L1-norm variant 
L1-Tucker is the L1-norm-based, robust variant of Tucker decomposition. L1-HOSVD is the analogous of HOSVD for the solution to L1-Tucker.

References 

Multilinear algebra
Tensors